Đức Linh is a rural district of Bình Thuận province in the Southeast region of Vietnam. As of 2003, the district had a population of 132,650. The district covers an area of 536 km². The district capital lies at Võ Xu.

References

Districts of Bình Thuận province